The 1991–92 Tulane Green Wave men's basketball team represented Tulane University in the 1991–92 college basketball season. This was head coach Perry Clark's third season at Tulane. The Green Wave competed in the Metro Conference and played their home games at Devlin Fieldhouse. They finished the season 22–9 (8–4 in Metro play) and finished atop the conference regular season standings. Tulane lost by a point in the championship game of the Metro Conference tournament, but received an at-large bid to the 1992 NCAA tournament – the first tournament appearance in program history. The Green Wave defeated St. John's in the opening round before losing to Oklahoma State in the round of 32 – a game in which the Cowboys shot an astronomical 80% from the field.

Roster

Schedule and results

|-
!colspan=9 style=| Regular season

|-
!colspan=9 style=| Metro Conference tournament

|-
!colspan=9 style=| NCAA tournament

Rankings

References

Tulane
Tulane Green Wave men's basketball seasons
Tulane
Tulane
Tulane